Federico Revuelto (born 1883) was a Guatemalan footballer who played for the Madrid Football Club from 1902 to 1912.

Biography 
Federico Revuelto was born in Cuyotenango, Suchitepéquez, Guatemala in 1883.

Revuelto initially started playing rugby football in England. He then switched to association football and joined the newly formed Madrid Football Club in 1902 at the age of 19, playing as a left-center forward. From 1903 to 1904, Revuelto served as the club's captain. He played in the 1903, 1905, 1906, 1907, and 1908 Copa del Rey finals, winning the latter four and scoring the first goal of the 1908 final. He served as interim president of Madrid FC in 1913.

Revuelto is listed in Real Madrid's "hall of fame" in the Santiago Bernabéu Stadium.

See also 
 List of Real Madrid CF players

References 

1883 births
20th-century deaths
Year of death unknown
Date of death missing
Guatemalan footballers
Real Madrid CF players
Association football inside forwards
Guatemalan expatriate sportspeople in Spain
Guatemalan expatriate footballers
Expatriate footballers in Spain